The Padma Bhushan is the third-highest civilian award of the Republic of India. Instituted on 2January 1954, the award is given for "distinguished service of a high order", without distinction of race, occupation, position, or sex. The recipients receive a Sanad, a certificate signed by the President of India and a circular-shaped medallion with no monetary association. The recipients are announced every year on Republic Day (26January) and registered in The Gazette of India, a publication used for official government notices and released weekly by the Department of Publication, under the Ministry of Urban Development. The conferral of the award is not considered official without its publication in the Gazette. The names of recipients whose awards have been revoked or restored, both of which require the authority of the President, are archived, and recipients who are struck from the register are required to surrender their medals; none of the conferments of Padma Bhushan during 1990–1999 have been revoked or restored. The recommendations are received from all the state and the union territory governments, as well as from Ministries of the Government of India, the Bharat Ratna and the Padma Vibhushan awardees, the Institutes of Excellence, the Ministers, the Chief Ministers and the Governors of State, and the Members of Parliament including private individuals.

When instituted in 1954, the Padma Bhushan was classified as "Dusra Varg" (Class II) under the three-tier Padma Vibhushan awards, which were preceded by the Bharat Ratna in hierarchy. On 15January 1955, the Padma Vibhushan was reclassified into three different awards as the Padma Vibhushan, the Padma Bhushan and the Padma Shri. The criteria included "distinguished service of a high order in any field including service rendered by Government servants", but excluded those working with the public sector undertakings with the exception of doctors and scientists. The 1954 statutes did not allow posthumous awards; this was subsequently modified in the January 1955 statute. The centrally placed pattern made of outer lines of a square of  side is embossed with a knob carved within each of the outer angles of the pattern. A raised circular space of diameter  is placed at the centre of the decoration. A centrally located lotus flower is embossed on the obverse side of the medal and the text "Padma" is placed above and the text "Bhushan" is placed below the lotus written in Devanagari script. The State Emblem of India is displayed in the centre of the reverse side, together with the national motto of India, "Satyameva Jayate" (Truth alone triumphs) in Devanagari script, which is inscribed on the lower edge. The rim, the edges and all embossing on either side is of standard gold with the text "Padma Bhushan" of gold gilt. The medal is suspended by a pink riband  in width with a broad white stripe in the middle. It is ranked fifth in the order of precedence of wearing of medals and decorations of the Indian civilian and military awards.

In the 1990s, a total of 113 people were conferred with the award. Twenty-four awards were presented in both 1990 and 1991, followed by thirty-three in 1992. In February 1992, a writ petition was filed in the Kerala High Court questioning whether the civilian awards presented the Government of India were "titles" as per the Article 18 (1) of the Constitution of India. The subject constitutional article states that "no title, not being a military or academic distinction, shall be conferred by the State". Similar petition was also filed in August 1992 in the Indore Bench of the Madhya Pradesh High Court and a notice was issued on 25August that led to provisional suspension of all civilian awards. A Special Divisional Bench of the Supreme Court of India was set up with a panel of five judges that delivered the verdict on 15December 1995 that the "Bharat Ratna and Padma awards are not titles within Article 18 of the Constitution of India". Later in 1998 when the presentation of the awards resumed, eighteen recipients received the award followed by fourteen in 1999. The Padma Bhushan in the 1990s was also conferred upon five foreign recipients two from the United Kingdom and one each from Japan, New Zealand, and the United States. Individuals from ten fields were honoured that included twenty-six artists, twenty-three from literature and education, eighteen from science and engineering, fifteen from medicine, eleven from public affairs, ten from social work, three sportspersons, three from trade and industry, and two from civil services and other fields each.

Journalist Nikhil Chakravarty declined the award in 1990 so as to "not be identified with the establishment". Historian Romila Thapar declined to accept the award in 1992, and later again in 2005, stating that she would accept awards only "from academic institutions or those associated with my professional work". Similar to Chakravarty, journalist and civil servant K. Subrahmanyam also refused the honour citing that "bureaucrats and journalists should not accept any award from the government because they are more liable to be favoured."

Recipients

Explanatory notes

Non-citizen recipients

Posthumous recipients

References

Further reading

External links
 
 

Lists of Indian award winners